Bahman Hashemi (Original Name: Akbar Mirzahashemi) is an Iranian TV presenter and actor born on July 24, 1962, in Tehran, Iran.

Biography 
Bahman Hashemi first started his career as a presenter on television in 1992. After that, he continued his work in the dubbing department of movies and radio. Due to his voice and expression in dubbing, he became one of those who used his voice and art of dubbing for most trailers of movies and series in Iran, such as the trailer of Alarm für Cobra 11 series. He is currently in charge of the Monday and Wednesday live show Get on the line of IRIB TV5. He has a daughter named Saba.

Selected filmography
2003: Brighter than off (TV series)
2005: Tickle
2007: Zero Degree Turn (TV series)
2013: Capital (TV series)
2017: The Elephant King

TV performance
 Iranian Variety show
Get on the line

Dubbing
Road to Avonlea as Supporting and guest roles
Taaqatwar as Anil Dhawan
Serenity as Djimon Hounsou

References

External links 
 
 Bahman Hashemi at Official site

Iranian television presenters
Iranian male actors
Iranian radio and television presenters
Iranian male voice actors
1962 births
Living people
People from Tehran